Paka pri Predgradu is a small settlement northwest of Stari Trg ob Kolpi in southern Slovenia. It belongs to the Municipality of Kočevje. The area is part of the traditional region of Lower Carniola and is now included in the Southeast Slovenia Statistical Region.

Name
The name of the settlement was changed from Paka to Paka pri Predgradu in 1955.

References

External links

Paka pri Predgradu on Geopedia

Populated places in the Municipality of Kočevje